Sphaerichthys vaillanti, sometimes known as Vaillant's chocolate gourami, is a species of gourami. It is native to Asia, where it is known only from the Kalimantan region of Borneo in Indonesia. It is generally seen in pairs in small creeks where wood debris is abundant. It is known to mimic dead leaves as a form of camouflage. The species reaches 3.9 cm (1.5 inches) in standard length and is known to be a facultative air-breather.

References 

Luciocephalinae